Sharapov or Sharapova (feminine) is a Russian surname of Turkic origin. It originates from Şarap, meaning honor, wisdom in Turkic languages. Notable people with the surname include:

Arina Sharapova (born 1961), Russian TV presenter and journalist
Margarita Sharapova (born 1962), Russian novelist and short story writer
Maria Sharapova (born 1987), Russian tennis player
Ruslan Sharapov (born 1967), Belarusian judoka
Valeriy Sharapov, Ukrainian professor
Vladimir Sharapov, a leading character of the 1979 Soviet film The Meeting Place Cannot Be Changed

References

Russian-language surnames